My Time: A Boz Scaggs Anthology (1969–1997) is an anthology album by Boz Scaggs.

Track listing

Disc one
 "Runnin' Blue" – 	3:58
 "We Were Always Sweethearts" – 	3:29
 "Near You" – 	4:59
 "Painted Bells" – 	4:02
 "Dinah Flo" – 	3:04
 "Might Have to Cry" – 	4:06
 "You Make It So Hard (To Say No)" – 	3:34
 "I Got Your Number" – 	3:48
 "Slow Dancer" – 	3:14
 "Hercules" – 	4:04
 "What Can I Say" – 	3:00
 "It's Over" – 	2:50
 "Harbor Lights" – 	5:57
 "Lowdown" – 	5:16
 "Lido Shuffle" – 	3:43
 "We're All Alone" – 	4:12
 "Loan Me a Dime" – 	13:04

Disc two
 "Hard Times" – 	4:30
 "1993" – 	4:05
 "Jojo" – 	5:52
 "Isn't It Time" – 	4:54
 "Simone" – 	5:08
 "Breakdown Dead Ahead" – 	4:35
 "Miss Sun" – 	5:32
 "Look What You've Done to Me" – 	5:18
 "Heart of Mine" – 	4:14
 "What's Number One?" – 	3:59
 "Drowning in the Sea of Love" – 	5:02
 "Sierra" – 	5:21
 "Some Change" – 	6:11
 "As The Years Go Passing By - 	4:44 
 "Just Go" – 	3:01
 "Goodnight Louise" – 	4:02

References

Boz Scaggs albums
1997 greatest hits albums
Columbia Records compilation albums
Legacy Recordings compilation albums